Strużka may refer to the following places:
Strużka, Greater Poland Voivodeship (west-central Poland)
Strużka, Lubusz Voivodeship (west Poland)
Strużka, Chojnice County in Pomeranian Voivodeship (north Poland)
Strużka, Człuchów County in Pomeranian Voivodeship (north Poland)